Marʻī ibn Yūsuf ibn Abī Bakr Aḥmad al-Karmī (1580, Tulkarm – 1624, Cairo), often referred as Marʻī ibn Yūsuf al-Karmī, was a Muslim scholar and one of the most famous Hanbali scholars in the Arab world. He was born in Tulkarm, and died in Cairo. He authored several books and most of them are related to Islam.

Life
Mar'i al-Karmi was born in Tulkarm in Palestine on April 1580 in the sixteenth century. There are differences among Muslim scholars about his year of birth. Karmi grew up in Tulkarm, and he completed his education from Tulkarm, then he studied Islamic sciences in Jerusalem.

After that, he went to Egypt and joined the Al-Azhar. There, he studied with Shaykh Manṣūr al-Buhūtī. Mar'i al-Karmi became one of the famous scholars of Al-Azhar, then he became the main Shaykh in the Mosque of Sultan Hassan.

Works
His works has been collected in "Majmu' Rasail al-'Allamah Mar'i al-Karmi al-Hanbali".

He was the author of more than one hundred books in many subjects such as Fiqh, Aqeedah, Tafsir, history, poetry and Quranic studies. Some of them are:
 Bahjat al-Nazirin wa Ayat al-Mustadillin (The Delight of Onlookers and the Signs for Investigators), a treatise on cosmology and eschatology (the affairs of the Last Judgment and the Afterlife).
Dalīl al-ṭālib li-nayl al-maṭālib.
Shifāʼ al-ṣudūr fī ziyārat Al-Mashāhid wal Qubūr
Al-Kawākib ad-Duriya fī Manāqib Al-Mujtahid Ibn Taymiyyah
 Aqāwīl al-thiqāt fī tā'wīl al-asmā' wa-al-sifāt wa-al-ayāt al-muhkamāt wa-al-mutashabahāt.
Taḥqīq al-burhān fī ithbāt ḥaqīqat al-mīzān.
Lafẓ al-muwaṭṭaʼ fī bayān al-ṣalāh al-wusṭá.
Dafʻ al-Shubhah.
Qalāʼid al-marjān fī al-nāsikh wa-al-mansūkh min al-Qurʼān.

Personal life
He was married and had two sons, Yahya and Ahmad.

Death
Mar'i al-Karmi died in Cairo in 1624, and was buried there.

References

External links
 Mar'i al-Karmi on Virtual International Authority File

17th-century Muslim theologians
Muslim scholars of Islamic jurisprudence
Hadith scholars
People from Tulkarm
Palestinian Sunni Muslim scholars of Islam
Encyclopedists from the Ottoman Empire
Arab Sunni Muslim scholars of Islam
1580 births
1624 deaths
Biographical evaluation scholars
Hanbalis
Al-Azhar University alumni